Single Island is a high ice-covered island on the west side of the Amery Ice Shelf about  south of Landon Promontory. First plotted by ANARE (Australian National Antarctic Research Expeditions) from air photos taken in 1956, but incorrectly shown as a promontory. Later mapped by ANARE as an island. Named by Antarctic Names Committee of Australia (ANCA) for M. Single, senior diesel mechanic at Mawson Station in 1962, a member of the ANARE field party which visited the area in December 1962.

Dodson Rocks are situated on the south side of Single Island.

Tingey Rocks are two small rock features located southwest of Single Island, also discovered by ANARE. Named by ANCA for R.J. Tingey, geologist with the party.

See also 
 List of Antarctic and sub-Antarctic islands

References 

Islands of Mac. Robertson Land